Inskip-with-Sowerby is a civil parish in the Wyre district of Lancashire, England.  It contains six listed buildings that are recorded in the National Heritage List for England.  All the listed buildings are designated at Grade II, the lowest of the three grades, which is applied to "buildings of national importance and special interest".  The parish includes the village of Inskip and surrounding countryside.  The listed buildings are two houses, two farmhouses, a former workshop, and a church.


Buildings

References

Citations

Sources

Lists of listed buildings in Lancashire
Buildings and structures in the Borough of Wyre